The OMX Copenhagen 25, formerly KFX and OMXC20) is the top-tier stock market index for Nasdaq Copenhagen, which is part of the Nasdaq Nordic, prior being replaced (as of December 2017) was known as OMX Copenhagen 20 index. It is a market value weighted index that consists of the 25 most-traded stock classes.

Components
The following 25 listings make up the index as of January 2021.

Footnotes

External links
 Bloomberg page for KFX:IND
Official OMX Copenhagen 25 composition
Reuters page for .OMXC25

European stock market indices
Nasdaq Nordic